Antrim is a town in Hillsborough County, New Hampshire, United States. The population was 2,651 at the 2020 census. The main village in the town, where 1,395 people lived at the 2020 census, is defined as the Antrim census-designated place (CDP) and is located at the intersection of U.S. Route 202 and New Hampshire Route 31. The town of Antrim also includes the villages of Antrim Center, North Branch, and Clinton Village.

History
Settled in 1741 and incorporated on March 22, 1777, this town did not receive its incorporated name until 1778. It was named for County Antrim in the north of Ireland, now part of Northern Ireland, which was the native home of the land's owner, Philip Riley. Scots-Irish settlers established a Presbyterian church in Antrim in 1788.

With falls providing water power, Great Brook was once lined with over twenty mills along its course from Gregg Lake to the Contoocook River. Commercial development centered on South Antrim, now the main village of Antrim. Cutlery was the major industry in this town, beginning with the manufacturing of apple-paring machines in 1864. The manufacture of cutlery continued in Antrim through 1989. The town is now largely a bedroom community for Peterborough and Hillsborough. It was home to the now-defunct Nathaniel Hawthorne College.

Geography
Antrim is drained by the Contoocook River and its North Branch, in addition to Great Brook. Gregg Lake and Willard Pond are in the west. Antrim lies fully within the Merrimack River watershed.

It includes the main village of Antrim (once known as South Antrim or South Village), plus parts of Clinton Village and Antrim Center.

Adjacent municipalities 
 Windsor, New Hampshire (north)
 Hillsborough, New Hampshire (northeast)
 Deering, New Hampshire (east)
 Bennington, New Hampshire (southeast)
 Hancock, New Hampshire (south)
 Nelson, New Hampshire (southwest)
 Stoddard, New Hampshire (west)

Demographics

As of the census of 2010, there were 2,637 people, 1,055 households, and 727 families residing in the town. There were 1,329 housing units, of which 274, or 20.6%, were vacant. 197 of the vacant units were for seasonal or recreational use. The racial makeup of the town was 97.4% white, 0.3% African American, 0.2% Native American, 0.4% Asian, 0.04% Native Hawaiian or Pacific Islander, 0.2% some other race, and 1.6% from two or more races. 1.2% of the population were Hispanic or Latino of any race.

Of the 1,055 households, 33.2% had children under the age of 18 living with them, 53.3% were headed by married couples living together, 10.0% had a female householder with no husband present, and 31.1% were non-families. 25.1% of all households were made up of individuals, and 9.6% were someone living alone who was 65 years of age or older. The average household size was 2.48, and the average family size was 2.92.

In the town, 22.7% of the population were under the age of 18, 7.8% were from 18 to 24, 22.3% from 25 to 44, 33.8% from 45 to 64, and 13.3% were 65 years of age or older. The median age was 43.5 years. For every 100 females, there were 97.7 males. For every 100 females age 18 and over, there were 97.9 males.

For the period 2011-2015, the estimated median annual income for a household was $64,830, and the median income for a family was $77,669. Male full-time workers had a median income of $50,991 versus $36,700 for females. The per capita income for the town was $28,760. 11.0% of the population and 6.5% of families were below the poverty line. 14.3% of the population under the age of 18 and 3.0% of those 65 or older were living in poverty.

Education 
Antrim is part of SAU (School Administrative Unit) #1, which is a school district that includes 9 towns, better known as the Contoocook Valley Regional School District.  Students from Antrim attend the following schools:

Elementary: Antrim Elementary School, located in Antrim
Middle: Great Brook School, located in Antrim
High: ConVal Regional High School, located in Peterborough

Sites of interest

 Antrim Historical Society & Museum

Notable people
 Luther "Guitar Junior" Johnson (1939–2022), musician
 Steve Sawyer (1956–2019), environmentalist, activist, leader of Greenpeace

References

External links
 
 James A. Tuttle Library
 New Hampshire Economic and Labor Market Information Bureau Profile

Towns in Hillsborough County, New Hampshire
Populated places established in 1741
Populated places established in 1845
Towns in New Hampshire
Scotch-Irish American culture in New Hampshire